Peter Augustus Alvares (1908 – 1975) was an Indian politician. He was the first Member of Parliament from North Goa Lok Sabha constituency (then Panjim), after liberation of Goa from Portuguese rule in 1962. He served as president of All India Railwaymen's Federation from 1968 to 1973 and was its general secretary from 1957 to 1968.

References 

1908 births
1975 deaths
India MPs 1962–1967
Maharashtrawadi Gomantak Party politicians